Simon Le Coultre is a Swiss professional ice hockey defenceman who is currently playing with Genève-Servette HC of the National League (NL). He played his junior hockey with the Moncton Wildcats of the QMJHL.

Playing career
Le Coultre played 154 games (60 points) over 3 seasons with the Moncton Wildcats of the QMJHL.

On January 8, 2019, Le Coultre signed his first professional contract with Genève-Servette HC of the National League, agreeing to a 3-year deal. Le Coultre scored his first NL goal on September 20, 2019, against HC Ambrì-Piotta in a 3-2 shootout win at the Valascia. He finished his first NL season having played all 50 regular season games and tallied 19 points (5 goals).

On January 16, 2021, Le Coultre was issued a two-game suspension and a CHF 1,700 fine for a late hit on HC Ambrì-Piotta's Brian Flynn in a game on January 12, 2021.

On July 6, 2021, Le Coultre was signed to an early two-year contract extension by Servette through the 2023-24 season.

International play
Le Coultre played in the 2018 and 2019 IIHF World Junior Championship with Switzerland's under-20 national team.

Le Coultre made his debut with Switzerland men's national team at the 2019 Deutschland Cup.

References

External links

1999 births
Living people
Genève-Servette HC players
Moncton Wildcats players
Swiss ice hockey defencemen
People from Jura-North Vaudois District
Sportspeople from the canton of Vaud